Paula McMath is a Canadian singer-songwriter from Kingsville, Ontario, currently based in Los Angeles. McMath was named one of Music Connection's Hot 100 Unsigned Artists in 2006. Her album, Because We Bleed, was released in 2005.  Her second CD, Trust the Sky, was reviewed by Paul Zollo, Senior Editor of American Songwriter, who said "it resounds like the work of a mature, experienced singer-songwriter, someone who's been doing this for decades.  But like Laura Nyro, Carole King, and others who wrote inimitable masterpieces from the very start, Paula is a prodigiously gifted singer – songwriter who has taken her inherent abilities and soared with them." McMath was also featured in Music Connection's year end top 25 new music critiques for 2010. Two songs from Because We Bleed, "Consumed" and "Can't Stop Thinkin' of You", were included in the season 2 DVD release of Everwood.

Discography
 Because We Bleed (2005)
Lonely Blue
Wet
Consumed
Can't Stop Thinkin' of You
Alive with My Demons
Naked
10 of 9
Virgin Queen Elizabeth the First
When You Go
No More
Deep Blue Dawn

 Trust the Sky (2009)
3 Flights of Stairs
Elevator
I Feel Small
Trust the Sky
Will I Ever Know Love
Without Ever Saying a Word
All the Time I'm Gonna Kill
Maybe One Day
Taken All My Life
Walking Slowly
Until I Don't Know When
So Long

References

External links
Paula McMath official website

Year of birth missing (living people)
Living people
Musicians from Windsor, Ontario
Canadian women singer-songwriters